Rtishchevo is a town in Saratov Oblast, Russia, located  west of Saratov, the administrative center of the oblast. Population:

History
The village of Rtishchevo was first mentioned in 1666; the modern settlement was built near Rtishchevo railway station in 1871. It was granted town status in 1920.

Administrative and municipal status
Within the framework of administrative divisions, Rtishchevo serves as the administrative center of Rtishchevsky District, even though it is not a part of it. As an administrative division, it is incorporated separately as Rtishchevo Town Under Oblast Jurisdiction—an administrative unit with the status equal to that of the districts. As a municipal division, Rtishchevo Town Under Oblast Jurisdiction is incorporated within Rtishchevsky Municipal District as Rtishchevo Urban Settlement.

Military
It was home to the Rtishchevo air base.

Population trends

References

Notes

Sources

External links
Unofficial website of Rtishchevo 

Cities and towns in Saratov Oblast
Saratov Governorate